Calomera aulica is a species of tiger beetle in the genus Calomera. The species lives in the Arab Emirates, Algeria, Egypt, Greece, Iran, Israel, Oman, Syria, Tunisia and Yemen. It has three subspecies, Calomera aulica aulica, Calomera aulica polysita and Calomera aulica tschitscherini.

References

Cicindelidae
Beetles described in 1831